Bill Lenny (5 January 1924 – 7 January 2002) was a British film editor. Among his films were Cromwell (1970), Casino Royale (1967) and Hammer Film's original Dracula (1958). He was nominated for an Emmy and Eddie award for work on Ike (1979), and for a second Eddie for Life on the Mississippi (1980).

References

External links

British film editors
1924 births

2002 deaths
Film people from London